Silvestre de Sousa (born 31 December 1980 in São Francisco do Maranhão, Brazil) is a Brazilian flat racing jockey based in Britain. He was champion jockey of Britain in 2015, with 132 winners, and again in 2017 and 2018.

Childhood and early career 
He was born in São Francisco do Maranhão, Maranhão. He moved to São Paulo when he was 17 years old.
The youngest of ten siblings, de Sousa was 18 before he sat on a racehorse for the first time. This came after a chance meeting with a man who worked at the local Cidade Jardim racecourse, who introduced him to Fausto Durso (one of the leading jockeys in São Paulo at the time, later twice champion jockey in Macau). Durso suggested that de Sousa had the build of a jockey.

David Nicholls
In an interview with the magazine Thoroughbred Owner & Breeder, de Sousa remembers an inauspicious beginning to his career. “I started very badly…it took me six months to get my first ride, but 16 months later I was champion apprentice and had lost my claim.” After breaking his arm in a fall, de Sousa was sidelined for six months; riding fewer after his return, he joined Irish trainer Dermot Weld. However, the move did not work out; de Sousa initially struggled to adjust to the change in environment. After two years without a ride in public, de Sousa was offered the chance to move to England and link up with Thirsk-based trainer David Nicholls. de Sousa remembers the moment he was offered the role, recalling “What did I have to lose?  I thought I would try it for two weeks on the way home (to Sao Paulo), but from the beginning Mr. Nicholls started organizing my paperwork and I rode in my first race soon after”. By the end of 2006 (his first season in Britain), de Sousa had ridden 27 winners from 195 runners for a win rate of 14 percent.

Mark Johnston
With Nicholls using his son Adrian as first jockey and de Sousa getting many outside rides, de Sousa decided to freelance. He continued to ride winners; after winning 21, 35 and 68 races in 2007, 2008 and 2009 respectively, he reached his maiden century of winners in 2010 and attracted the attention of northern trainer Mark Johnston. In a 2011 BBC interview Johnston said, “I noticed him last season when he rode 100 winners for mainly small trainers, often on horses at long odds”.

With support from the Mark Johnston yard, de Sousa made a good start in 2011. After initially being excluded from some bookmakers’ lists for the flat-jockeys’ championship, with monthly totals of 24, 20 and 27 winners in May, June and July respectively he was heading the title race. His association with Johnston led to big wins at Epsom Racecourse on Derby Day and twice at Royal Ascot; his first wins at the Royal meeting came on Fox Hunt in the Duke of Edinburgh Stakes and Namibian in the Queen's Vase. De Sousa described his Ascot victories as "unbelievable", saying “when you look at my background, you would never think I would ride a winner in Royal Ascot”.

The 2010 champion jockey Paul Hanagan regained the lead by September; having incurred a four-day suspension in early October, de Sousa's chances of a first title were fading. He continued to focus on his championship challenge with 32 winners in October; however, Mark Johnston's decision to put de Sousa on Fox Hunt in Australia's Melbourne Cup was another blow to his title bid. Explaining the logic behind his decision to send de Sousa to Melbourne to ride the Duke Of Edinburgh winner, Johnston said  “He (de Sousa) would rather win four races at Wolverhampton and be called champion jockey than have to come out here. But I hope that if he wins the Melbourne Cup then he’ll realize that’s much bigger than being champion jockey”. Fox Hunt finished seventh in the Cup.

Despite failing (by four winners) to pass Hanagan in the title race, 2011 was de Sousa's best-ever season. He finished with 161 winners. While Hanagan suggested he may not try for a third successive title, de Sousa had no such qualms. “I don’t have to waste. I wake up every morning, eight stone. Of course, I get tired at the end of the day but after sleeping, you’re fresh again.”

He was again runner-up (to Richard Hughes) in 2012, and third in 2013, again behind Hughes.

Godolphin

For a short time, de Sousa was retained as a jockey by Godolphin, though the partnership was ultimately unsuccessful.

He bounced back from losing the job, by winning the British flat racing Champion Jockey's title in 2015.

For the 2016 flat season, he was signed by Betway as brand ambassador, and finished second in the jockeys' championship to Jim Crowley.

In 2017, he was again Champion. He rode his 200th winner of the year at Lingfield on 18 October, and with 155 wins in the Championship period, he effectively won the title with weeks to spare. He identified the highlights of his year as the day he rode six winners - five at Sandown and one at Goodwood - and his Cesarewitch Handicap win on Withhold.

Speaking of retaining his title, he said, "I can't see why I won't be going for a third title. I want to do very well again next year and if I had the same support this year I hope to ride plenty of winners. If the good horses come I will ride them, but if not I will go to Catterick [a relatively minor track] and anywhere else to ride the winners."

Major wins
 France
 Prix Morny - (1) - Pretty Pollyanna (2018)

 Italy
 Premio Roma – (1) – Hunter's Light (2012)

 United Arab Emirates
 Dubai Turf - (1) - Sajjhaa (2013)
 Dubai World Cup - (1) - African Story (2014)
 Al Maktoum Challenge, Round 3 - (1) - Hunter's Light (2013)

 Hong Kong
 Hong Kong Cup - (1) - Glorious Forever (2018)

 Great Britain
 British Champions Sprint Stakes - (1) - Donjuan Triumphant (2019)
 International Stakes - (1) - Arabian Queen (2015)
 Champion Stakes - (1) - Farhh (2013)
 Lockinge Stakes - (1) - Farhh (2013)
 Nunthorpe Stakes - (1) - Winter Power (2021)

Year-end charts for North America

References

External links 
https://twitter.com/SilvDSousa
Racing Post
https://web.archive.org/web/20120127002448/http://www.racingforchange.co.uk/
http://willowracing.com

Brazilian jockeys
Living people
1980 births
British Champion flat jockeys
Sportspeople from Maranhão